The Battle Creek Enquirer is a daily newspaper in Battle Creek, Michigan. The newspaper, owned by the Gannett, is the only daily paper serving Calhoun County, Michigan and parts of four neighboring counties.

In the late 1950s, the Enquirer sponsored the George Award, which was meant to recognize civic-minded citizens.

References

External links 

 

Calhoun County, Michigan
Gannett publications
Newspapers published in Michigan